Todd Komarnicki (born 19 October 1965 in Long Beach, CA) is an American playwright, novelist, screenwriter, director, and producer.

Career 

He authored the play Beautiful Boy, produced in a theater in Los Angeles in 1993, and that same year wrote a detective novel, Free. He self-published two more novels, Famine (1997) and War (2008).
 
His career breakthrough was producing Elf (with Jon Berg), the 2003 Christmas movie starring Will Ferrell and directed by Jon Favreau. In the same year, Komarnicki wrote and directed Resistance, a Dutch/American World War II film starring Bill Paxton and Julia Ormond, based on Anita Shreeve’s novel of the same name. In 2007, he wrote the neo-noir psychological thriller film Perfect Stranger, directed by James Foley, and starring Halle Berry and Bruce Willis. Komarnicki also co-wrote The Professor and the Madman (2019) with John Boorman and Farhad Safinia, starring Mel Gibson and Sean Penn.

In television, Komarnicki has written pilots for ABC, NBC, CBS, FOX, and TNT, and is currently writing his new show, AMERICAN SHERLOCK, for Netflix.

In the literary world, his first novel, Free, was published by Doubleday in 1993 and his second novel, famine (Arcade 1997), received tremendous reviews and was subsequently translated into French, Italian, and German. His third novel, war, was published to exceptional reviews in July of 2008 by Arcade.

Komarnicki is the president & founder of the production/management company Guy Walks Into A Bar. All told, Komarnicki’s films have accounted for well over half a billion dollars at the box office.

Meet Dave 

Produced by Guy Walks Into a Bar, Meet Dave (2008) is a bawdy space comedy starring Eddie Murphy and Elizabeth Banks, directed by Brian Robbins and written by Rob Greenberg and Bill Corbett.

Sully 

Komarnicki received great critical acclaim for writing Sully (2015), starring Tom Hanks and directed by Clint Eastwood. Sully is about Captain Chesley “Sully” Sullenberger’s emergency landing of US Airways Flight 1549 in the Hudson River, based on Sullenberger’s 2009 autobiography Highest Duty. [3] The film debuted at $35.5 million in the U.S. its opening weekend, and went on to gross a total of $238 million worldwide, outperforming initial expectations. Sully was selected as an AFI Top Ten film for 2016, and won Best Foreign Film at the 40th Japanese Academy Prize Awards 2017.

Mercury 13 (Pre-production) 

Komarnicki is currently working on 1960s NASA Event Series Mercury 13 (working title) with TV Producer Christina Wayne and Oscar-nominated actress Jessica Chastain. The series will chronicle the story of the 13 daring and determined female American pilots willing to risk it all to achieve their dream of becoming astronauts. They are known as the Mercury 13. Komarnicki is writing the project and producing via Guy Walks Into a Bar.

The Trainer (Pre-production) 

Written by David Donahue, Todd Komarnicki, and James Villemaire, The Trainer is the story of a premier horse trainer beset by tragedy who bonds over a horse with a girl running from her own horrors.

God's Spy (Post-production) 
Written and produced by Komarnicki, God's Spy is the true story of pastor-turned-spy Dietrich Bonhoeffer that wrapped filming in January 2023. Bonhoeffer is played by Jonas Dassler

Filmography

References

1965 births
Living people
Writers from Philadelphia